The Tangle Lakes (Long Tangle Lake, Lower Tangle Lake, Round Tangle Lake, and Upper Tangle Lake) are a  long chain of lakes connected by streams in interior Alaska. They form the headwaters for the Delta River.

Access and use
The boat launch is also the upper terminus of the Delta River Canoe Trail, a 2-3 day route to the Gulkana River and the Richardson Highway. The lakes support many species of fish, including lake trout, burbot, and Arctic grayling. The area around the lakes consists mostly of tundra due to the high elevation.

History

The Tangle Lakes area has been the subject of extensive archaeological exploration. Prior to 1976, almost 150 sites had been discovered showing that The Tangle Lakes have been populated intermittently since the settlement of the New World. The sites are concentrated closely to the lakes in a range covering about 80 square kilometers and the attraction of the location was most likely that the windswept hills surrounding the lakes would have attracted caribou seeking to graze on the exposed lichen (not for fishing as the lakes would not have been able to support a settlement).  Part of the Tangle Lakes area has been listed on the National Register of Historic Places as an archaeological district in 1971.

See also
National Register of Historic Places listings in Copper River Census Area, Alaska
National Register of Historic Places listings in Matanuska-Susitna Borough, Alaska

References

Further reading
Pellerin, L. (2003). Magnetotelluric data in the Delta River Mining District, near the Tangle Lakes area of south-central Alaska [Open-file Report 03-328]. Denver, CO: U.S. Department of the Interior, U.S. Geological Survey.

External links
Fish Alaska Magazine
Lonely Planet Alaska
BLM Alaska
Unofficial Guide to Adventure Travel in Alaska
Archaeology of Prehistoric Native Alaska
BLM Tangle Lakes Archaeological District trail brochure

Archaeological sites on the National Register of Historic Places in Alaska
Historic districts on the National Register of Historic Places in Alaska
Lakes of Alaska
Lakes of Copper River Census Area, Alaska
National Register of Historic Places in Copper River Census Area, Alaska
National Register of Historic Places in Matanuska-Susitna Borough, Alaska
Tourist attractions in Copper River Census Area, Alaska